A leise is a type of medieval church song. "Leise" may also refer to:
Leise Maersk, the name of several cargo ships in the Maersk line
Tanya Leise, American biomathematician